Lieutenant General Nguyễn Văn Mạnh was an officer of the Army of the Republic of Vietnam.

He served as the commander of IV Corps, which oversaw the Mekong Delta region of the country, from 23 November 1966 until 29 February 1968, when he was replaced by Lieutenant General Nguyen Duc Thang after he was caught out by the communists' Tet Offensive.Tucker, pp. 526–533. 

During the Tet Offensive, Manh barricaded himself inside his villa and refused to fight, leaving the work to his subordinates and American advisors.

Notes

References 

Army of the Republic of Vietnam generals